Michalovice is a municipality and village in Havlíčkův Brod District in the Vysočina Region of the Czech Republic. It has about 200 inhabitants.

History
The first written mention of Michalovice is from 1377.

References

Villages in Havlíčkův Brod District